The tenth series of Last of the Summer Wine aired on BBC1 in 1988. All of the episodes were written by Roy Clarke and produced and directed by Alan J. W. Bell.

Outline
The trio in this series consisted of:

First appearances

Smiler Hemingway (1988, 1990–2007)
PC Walsh (1988–1989, 2004–2010)
Auntie Wainwright (1988–1989, 1992–2010)

List of episodes
Regular series

Christmas Special (1988)

DVD release
The box set for series nine was released by Universal Playback in May 2008, mislabelled as a box set for series 9 & 10. In the Complete Collection set, the 6 regular episodes of Series 10 are found on the disc labelled "Series 11 & 12 DVD 1". The DVD's main menu is mislabelled as "Series 11". The Christmas Special Crums is found on the disc labelled "Series 11 & 12 DVD 3".

Notes

See also

Last of the Summer Wine series
1988 British television seasons